Women He's Undressed is a 2015 Australian documentary film about costume designer Orry-Kelly. Directed by Gillian Armstrong, it stars Darren Gilshenan, Deborah Kennedy, David E. Woodley, and Lara Cox.

Interviewees
Jane Fonda
Angela Lansbury
Catherine Martin
Leonard Maltin
Ann Roth
Colleen Atwood
Michael Wilkinson
Deborah Nadoolman Landis

Cast
 Darren Gilshenan as Orry-Kelly
 Deborah Kennedy as Florence Kelly
 David E. Woodley as William Kelly
 Lara Cox as Ginger Rogers

Reception
On review aggregator Rotten Tomatoes, 91% of 33 critics have given the film a positive review, with an average rating of 7.7/10.

References

External links

Review of film at Variety
Review of film at Hollywood Reporter
Review of film at The Guardian
Review of film at SBS

2015 films
Australian documentary films
Documentary films about the film industry
Films directed by Gillian Armstrong
Documentary films about fashion designers
Documentary films about Hollywood, Los Angeles
2015 documentary films
2010s English-language films